

School records 

Active players in bold.

Career

Division II/III
Most goals in a career: Chris Johnstone, 114 (1981–85)
Most assists in a career: Mike Bournazakis, 148 (1999–03)
Most points in a career: Chris Johnstone, 250 (1981–85)
Most penalty minutes in a career:
Most points in a career, defenseman:
Most assists in a career, defenseman: Jerry Galway, 120 (1997–99, 2000–02)
Most wins in a career: Jaime Morris, 87 (1995–99)
Most shutouts in a career: (tie) Tyler Euverman, 12 (1999–03); Dave Burkholder, 12 (1980–84)

Division I
Most goals in a career: Erik Brown, 56 (2015–2019)
Most assists in a career: Dan Ringwald, 102 (2006–10)
Most points in a career: Cameron Burt, 138 (2008–12)
Most penalty minutes in a career: Taylor McReynolds, 336 (2008–12)
Most points in a career, defenseman: Dan Ringwald, 123 (2006–10)
Most assists in a career, defenseman: Dan Ringwald, 102 (2006–10)
Most wins in a career: Jared DeMichiel, 41 (2006–10)
Most shutouts in a career: Shane Madolora, 13 (2009–12)

Season

Player

Division II/III
Most goals in a season: Steve Toll, 39 (1996–97)
Most assists in a season: Mike Bournazakis, 52 (2000–01)
Most points in a season: Steve Toll, 84 (1996–97)
Most penalty minutes in a season:
Most points in a season, defenseman:
Most wins in a season: Dave Burkholder, 28 (1983–84)
Most shutouts in a season: Dave Burkholder, 7 (1983–84)
Most power play goals in a season:  Pete Bournazakis, 17 (2000–01)

Division I
Most goals in a season: Matt Smith, 27 (2007–08)
Most assists in a season: Josh Mitchell, 36 (2014–15)
Most points in a season: Matt Garbowsky, 54 (2014–15)
Most penalty minutes in a season: Taylor McReynolds, 138 (2010–11)
Most points in a season, defenseman: Dan Ringwald, 37 (2009–10)
Most wins in a season: Jared DeMichiel, 27 (2009–10)
Most shutouts in a season: Shane Madolora, 7 (2011–12)
Most power play goals in a season: Matt Smith, 17 (2007–08)

Team

Division II/III
Most wins in a season: 31 (1985–86)
Most overtime games in a season:
Longest winning streak: 17 (1983–1984)

Division I
Most wins in a season: 28 (2009–10)
Most overtime games in a season: 11 (2007–2008)
Longest winning streak: 12 (February 12, 2010 – April 8, 2010)
Longest overall unbeaten streak: 12 (February 12, 2010 – April 8, 2010)

Game

Player

Division II/III
Most goals in a game: Norm McEachern, 6 (1963–64 vs. Syracuse)
Most assists in a game: Maurice Montambault, 8 (1985–86 vs. Brockport)
Most points in a game: (tie) Mike Bournazakis, 9 (2001–02 vs. Neumann); Maurice Montambault, 9 (1985–86 vs. Brockport)
Most penalty minutes in a game:

Division I
Most goals in a game: (tie) Brad McGowan, 4 (March 14, 2015 vs. Air Force); Erik Brown, 4 (17 February, 2018 vs. Sacred Heart)
Most assists in a game: Brent Patry, 5 (October 21, 2006 vs. AIC)
Most points in a game: (tie) Brent Patry, 5 (October 21, 2006 vs. AIC); Cameron Burt, 5 (twice) (March 20, 2010 vs. Sacred Heart; October 15, 2011 vs. St. Lawrence)
Most penalty minutes in a game:  Tyler Mazzei, 24 (January 19th, 2008 vs. Sacred Heart)

Team

Division II/III
Most goals in a game: 24 (February 8, 2002 vs. Neumann)
Most goals in a period: 10 (February 8, 2002, second period vs. Neumann)

Division I
Most goals in a game: 10 (January 14, 2012 vs. Sacred Heart)
Most goals in a period: 5 (eight times) (October 20, 2006, second period vs. AIC; January 10, 2009, second period vs. UConn; March 15, 2009, second period vs. Holy Cross; November 26, 2010, first period vs. Sacred Heart; January 14, 2012, third period vs Sacred Heart; March 14, 2015, third period vs Air Force; October 31, 2015, first period vs. AIC; February 20, 2016, second period vs. Niagara)
Most shots in a game: 63 (March 10, 2012 vs. Bentley)
Most shots in a period: 25 (November 17, 2007, second period vs. Mercyhurst)
Most penalty minutes in a game: 112 (February 9, 2008 vs. Canisius)

References

Ice hockey statistics
RIT Tigers men's ice hockey